Unnatural History II (subtitled Smiling in the Face of Perversity) is the second in the Unnatural History series of compilation albums by Coil. Unlike the compilations Stolen & Contaminated Songs and Gold Is the Metal with the Broadest Shoulders, the Unnatural History albums collect songs from more than one era of Coil's work.

Compilation origins

 "Red Weather" originally appeared on the compilation cassette Bethel. 
 "Theme from Blue I" and "Theme from Blue II" originally appeared on Themes for Derek Jarman's Blue.
 "Airborne Bells" is from the Airborne Bells/Is Suicide a Solution? single. 
 "Another Brown World" is from the 12"/CD compilation Myths 4 – Sinople Twilight in Catal Hüyük. 
 "Contains a Disclaimer" is from the compilation Pathological Compilation. 
 "The Hellraiser Theme" was released on The Unreleased Themes for Hellraiser as "Hellraiser". 
 "The Hellbound Heart" and "No New World" were released on the CD version of The Unreleased Themes for Hellraiser. "The Box Theme" was also released on The Unreleased Themes for Hellraiser, as "Box Theme". 
 "In Memory of The Truth", "Unquiet Rest" and "Wait, Then Return" were previously unreleased material from The Unreleased Themes for Hellraiser session. 
 "Vanishing Point" was released on the CD version of The Unreleased Themes for Hellraiser as "Attack of the Sennapods". 
 "The Main Title" was released as "Main Title" on all versions of The Unreleased Themes for Hellraiser. 
 "The Hills Are Alive" was originally released on the compilation Macro Dub Infection Vol. 1.

Other information
Track 15 contains the songs "Themes from Blue II" and "The Hills Are Alive". The two tracks are separated by silence from 2:18 to 3:46. "The Hills Are Alive" is not listed on the track listing on the back insert or CD booklet.

The album was originally shipped with a postcard.

This album was available via download at Coil's official website Thresholdhouse.com in aac, mp3, and lossless flac formats.

Track listing

Personnel

Writing, Performance 

 John Balance
 Peter Christopherson (tracks 2-16)
 Drew McDowall (track 2, 15)
 Stephen Thrower (tracks 3-14)

Artwork 

 Peter Smith

References

External links
 
 
 Unnatural History II at Brainwashed

1995 compilation albums
Coil (band) compilation albums